Hezekiah Holland may refer to

Hezekiah Holland (minister), 17th-century English clergyman
Hezekiah Russel Holland (born 1936), United States federal judge